William Robertson (8 April 1874 – after 1904) was a Scottish professional footballer who played for Abercorn, Small Heath and Bristol Rovers between 1894 and 1903.

Life and career
Robertson was born in Dumbarton, Scotland. He played football for Renfrew Victoria before joining Abercorn in 1894.

Robertson joined English First Division club Small Heath in February 1896, and played eight times before the team were relegated at the end of the season. Having started his career as an inside forward, he had more success after a switch to wing half, and made more than 100 appearances in all competitions for the club. According to the Bristol Mercury, writing when Robertson first joined Bristol Rovers in 1899, "Last season he was looked upon as the best half in the Small Heath team." While a Bristol Rovers player, in March 1900, Robertson took part in the Home Scots v Anglo-Scots trial match, alongside namesakes Tom Robertson and Tommy Robertson. He later played for Workington.

Notes

References

1874 births
Year of death missing
Sportspeople from Dumbarton
Footballers from West Dunbartonshire
Scottish footballers
Association football inside forwards
Association football wing halves
Abercorn F.C. players
Renfrew Victoria F.C. players
Birmingham City F.C. players
Bristol Rovers F.C. players
Workington A.F.C. players
Scottish Football League players
Scottish Junior Football Association players
English Football League players
Southern Football League players
Place of death missing